Benjamin Franklin Fowler (November 11, 1860 - October 31, 1900) was the third Attorney General of Wyoming, serving from January 7, 1895 to January 3, 1898.

Fowler was born on November 11, 1860 in Hanover, Illinois. Fowler moved to Wyoming in 1884. Fowler served as Wyoming Attorney General from January 7, 1895 to January 3, 1898.

Fowler died on October 31, 1900.
He would have turned 40 years old on November 11, 1900.

References

1860 births
1900 deaths
Wyoming Attorneys General